The Biblioteca Classense is the public library of Ravenna, Italy.

In 1803, with the Napoleonic suppression of monasteries and religious institutions, a library was created to harbor the confiscated books. They were housed in the Library of the Camaldolese Monastery, which had been founded in the 17th century by the Abbott Pietro Canneti in the Abbey of Classe. The collection includes manuscript codices, incunabula, prints, musical works, and numerous artworks and books. Added to the collection included the library of the architect Camillo Morigia (1743-1795) and the art critic Corrado Ricci (1858-1934).

The library has a large collection of editions of the works related to Dante Alighieri.

See also 

 Codex Ravennas 429

References

Bibliography
in English
 

in Italian

External links

 Official site
 

Libraries in Ravenna
Ravenna
1803 establishments in Italy
Libraries established in 1803